The Avenue P station is a local station on the IND Culver Line of the New York City Subway. It is served by the F train at all times and the <F> train during rush hours in the peak direction.

History

This station opened at 3:00 a.m. on March 16, 1919, as part of the opening of the first section of the BMT Culver Line. The initial section began at the Ninth Avenue station and ended at the Kings Highway station. The line was operated as a branch of the Fifth Avenue Elevated line, with a free transfer at Ninth Avenue to the West End Line into the Fourth Avenue Subway. The opening of the line resulted in reduced travel times between Manhattan and Kings Highway. Construction on the line began in 1915, and cost a total of $3.3 million. Trains from this station began using the Fourth Avenue Subway to the Nassau Street Loop in Lower Manhattan when that line opened on May 30, 1931. The Fifth Avenue Elevated was closed on May 31, 1940, and elevated service ceased stopping here. On October 30, 1954, the connection between the IND South Brooklyn Line at Church Avenue and the BMT Culver Line at Ditmas Avenue opened. With the connection completed, all service at the stations on the former BMT Culver Line south of Ditmas Avenue, including this one, were from then on served by IND trains.

From June 1968 to 1987, express service on the elevated portion of the line from Church Avenue to Kings Highway operated in the peak direction (to Manhattan AM; to Brooklyn PM), with some F trains running local and some running express. During this time period, this station was used as a local station. Express service ended in 1987, largely due to budget constraints and complaints from passengers at local stations. Express service on the elevated Culver Line was ended due to necessary structural work, but never restored.

From June 7, 2016, to May 1, 2017, the southbound platform at this station was closed for renovations. The Manhattan-bound platform was closed for a longer period of time, from May 22, 2017 until July 30, 2018.

Station layout

This elevated station has two side platforms and three tracks with the center track not normally used.

Exits
The station has a full-time mezzanine at Avenue P and McDonald Avenue. It has six staircases: two to the northeast and southwest corners of that intersection, and two to each platform. There is a station facility constructed inside the mezzanine on the Manhattan-bound side, giving evidence that there was a third staircase that was removed at the southeast corner of McDonald Avenue and Avenue P.

References

External links 

 
 Station Reporter — F Train
 The Subway Nut — Avenue P Pictures 
 Avenue P entrance from Google Maps Street View
 Platforms from Google Maps Street View

P
BMT Culver Line stations
New York City Subway stations in Brooklyn
Railway stations in the United States opened in 1919
Midwood, Brooklyn
Bensonhurst, Brooklyn